"Mirror Image" is a science fiction short story by American writer Isaac Asimov, originally published in the May 1972 issue Analog Science Fiction and Fact, and collected in The Best of Isaac Asimov (1973), The Complete Robot (1982), Robot Visions (1990), and The Complete Stories, Volume 2 (1992).

After having received many requests to continue the story of detective Elijah Baley and his robot partner R. Daneel Olivaw, featured in his earlier novels The Caves of Steel and The Naked Sun, Asimov wrote this short detective story. After the story appeared, he received many letters from readers stating "Thanks, but we mean a novel".

Plot summary
Baley is unexpectedly contacted by Daneel regarding a dispute between two reputable Spacers on board a ship, who have just submitted essentially identical papers about a revolutionary mathematical technique. Each claims they originated the idea, and approached the other for confirmation only to have them steal the concept and pass it off as their own. Neither will admit guilt and it would reflect badly on the ship's captain not to resolve the authorship prior to arrival at the planet where the papers are to be presented. Daneel suggests Baley, an unbiased outsider, to the desperate captain.

Both Spacers have personal robots, who happen to be the same model from the same production batch, and were privy to the discussion between the mathematicians in exactly the same way. The robots' accounts of the dispute are, like their masters' stories, mirror images of each other, apart from the fact that one robot must be telling the truth and one is lying to protect its master's reputation. Being Spacers, neither scientist will speak to an Earthman, but they do allow Baley to unofficially interview their personal robots via telepresence. Both robots respond identically to Baley's questioning, stating they would lie to protect a human's reputation, until he capitalizes on the single difference between the parties: one is elderly and towards the end of his distinguished career, while the other, though brilliant has yet to establish himself fully.

He puts to the younger mathematician's robot that his master could still rebuild his reputation, but the elder's would be completely overshadowed by an indiscretion in his old age. In contrast, he puts to the older mathematician's robot that his master's reputation would remain and speak for itself, but the younger's would be completely ruined by an indiscretion of his youth. The younger's robot switches his story to protect the elder man, while the elder's robot tries to maintain the elder is innocent, but ends up malfunctioning.

Baley has tried to convince both robots to change their stories. He thus surmises that the elder is the plagiarist, because if the younger's robot received no instruction to lie, it could easily switch sides; while if the elder's robot had been instructed to lie, but became convinced that it should now tell the truth, it could not easily countermand the order of its own volition when only a reputation and not a human life was at risk, and this has led to conflict and shutdown.

R. Daneel reports that Baley is correct as the captain has extracted a confession, but points out that Baley not being a robopsychologist, his argument could be applied in reverse – a robot might easily override an instruction to lie if compelled to tell the truth, while a truth-telling robot might malfunction if convinced it should lie. Baley agrees that it could have gone either way, but the result matches his original suspicion that a younger man coming up with a new idea would easily consult someone he had revered and studied, whereas an older man would be unlikely to consult an "upstart" when he was about to arrive at a conference of his peers, and he only used the robot's response and his interpretation of it to force a confession from the elder mathematician.

References

External links
 

Robot series short stories by Isaac Asimov
1972 short stories
Works originally published in Analog Science Fiction and Fact